Auyo is a Local Government Area of Jigawa State, Nigeria. Its headquarters are in the town of Auyo.
 
It has an area of 512 km and a population of 132,001 at the 2006 census.

The postal code of the area is 731.

The Auyokawa language, now extinct, was formerly spoken in Auyo.

And its Also has ten (10) political words which include:

Auyo, Auyokayi, Ayama, Ayan, Gatafa, Gamafoi, Gamsarka, Kafur, Tsidir, and Unik.

Gallery

References

Local Government Areas in Jigawa State